Krystallopigi is a former community in Florina regional unit, West Macedonia, Greece. Since the 2011 local government reform it is part of the municipality Prespes, of which it is a municipal unit.

The municipal unit has an area of 101.984 km2. The population is 359 (2011). The main village is also called Krystallopigi. After the Greek Civil War, the village was resettled with Aromanians from Epirus. Today they still form the majority of the towns population.  Here is located the depopulated village Vambel.

Krystallopigi borders Albania to the west; Prespes municipality to the north;  Korestia municipality, Kastoria regional unit, to the east and southeast; and Kastraki community, Kastoria regional unit, to the south. A major road border crossing into Albania is located here. The Albanian side of the border crossing is known as Kapshtica, 9 km east from Bilisht.

Name 

Until 1926, the village was known as Smardesi. In the Bulgarian it is known as Смърдеш, Smardesh or Smrdesh, while in Macedonian as Смрдеш, Smrdeš. The original name of the village is believed to be derived from the local Slavic name of a nearby mineral spring Smrdliva Voda meaning stinky water. The modern name Krystallopigi means "crystal spring".

History 
The village was mentioned in an Ottoman defter of 1530, under the name of Ismirdesh, and was described as having 53 households. The bigger part of the population of Smerdesh in 19th and in the beginning of 20th century was Bulgarian. There were 1780 inhabitants in 1900.

Many residents of Smardesh took part in the struggle of IMORO. There was an illegal foundry and depot for hand grenades in 1903. The village was burned by Turkish troops in May 1903. It was plundered and burned for the second time in 1903 during the Ilinden–Preobrazhenie Uprising.

The name of the village was changed to Krystallopigi in 1926.

By the 1950s, the Greek government assisted a group of nomadic transhumant Aromanians, known as the Arvanitovlachs, to settle in depopulated villages of the Prespa region like Krystallopigi. Aromanians are the only inhabitants of the village.

Krystallopigi had 265 inhabitants in 1981. In fieldwork done by Riki Van Boeschoten in late 1993, Krystallopigi was populated by Aromanians.

Demographics

Notable persons 
 Vasil Chekalarov (1874–1913) - Bulgarian revolutionary

References 

Populated places in Florina (regional unit)
Albania–Greece border crossings
Former municipalities in Western Macedonia